Leonard Herbert Guest (1908-1965) was an Australian rugby league player who played in the 1920s.

Background
Guest was born in Narrandera, New South Wales and then lived at Kingsgrove, New South Wales before signing with St George.

Playing career
Guest played four seasons with St. George between 1926-1929. He played centre in the first St. George grand final team of 1927. Guest was a prolific goal kicker and was the club's top point scorer in 1928 and 1929. He scored nearly two hundred points for St. George during his four years at the club.

Death
Guest died on 22 October 1965, aged 57.

References

St. George Dragons players
Australian rugby league players
1908 births
1965 deaths
People from the Riverina
Rugby league players from New South Wales
Rugby league centres
Rugby league halfbacks
Rugby league five-eighths